Martine F. Roussel (born 1950) is a molecular oncologist in the United States. She is a member of the National Academy of Sciences. Roussel works at the St. Jude Children's Research Hospital in Memphis, Tennessee.

References

Living people
1950 births
Place of birth missing (living people)
American oncologists
Women oncologists
Members of the United States National Academy of Sciences
Date of birth missing (living people)